Sangay Dorji is a Bhutanese politician who has been a member of the National Council of Bhutan, since May 2018.

Education
He holds a Master's degree in Educational Management Administration and Leadership from Paro College of Education.

References 

Members of the National Council (Bhutan)
1980s births
Living people